Isaac Mpofu (born 20 August 1988) is a Zimbabwean long-distance runner who specialises in the marathon. He represented Zimbabwe at the 2019 World Athletics Championships, competing in the men's marathon. He finished in 52nd place.

References

External links
 

1988 births
Living people
Zimbabwean male long-distance runners
Zimbabwean male marathon runners
World Athletics Championships athletes for Zimbabwe